The Flag of Khyber Pakhtunkhwa is the flag of the Province of Khyber Pakhtunkhwa within Pakistan. The KPK provincial flag shows Jamrud Fort, the guardian of the Khyber Pass and mountains in the back. Displaying Pakistani national colours, white and dark Green, with a small Crescent and star at the top to represent the Muslim-majority all of which shows its Islamic heritage and strong ties with the Federation of Pakistan, and the Inscription below in a scroll reads the official name of the province in Urdu, respectively.

History

Related pages
 Flag of Pakistan (Federal)
 Government of Khyber Pakhtunkhwa
 KPK emblem
 List of Pakistani flags

References 

KPK
KPK
KPK
Khyber Pakhtunkhwa